Haveli is a taluka (Sub-division)  of  Pune district in the Indian state of Maharashtra. I

References

Cities and towns in Pune district
 

sinhagad fort is located in taluka of haveli.